Liam Picken (born 1 August 1986) is a former Australian rules footballer who played for the Western Bulldogs in the Australian Football League (AFL) from 2009 to 2017. In 2016 he played in the Bulldogs' premiership team (the club's first since 1954). He was from the western Victorian town of Hamilton.

Early playing career 
Before being drafted he completed a pre-season with Collingwood and two with the Bulldogs. He played 63 games and kicked 45 goals with Williamstown from 2005 to 2008 and in 2008 he was the Williamstown Seagulls best and fairest player in the Victorian Football League (VFL), winning the Gerry Callahan Medal and earning a position on the Bulldogs rookie list. He played in a Seconds premiership side at Williamstown in 2005 and finished in third place in the Seconds best and fairest the same year. He was awarded the most consistent player in the seniors in 2007.

AFL career 
Picken made his debut against North Melbourne on 5 April 2009, collecting 9 possessions in a traditional tagging role against Kangaroos stalwart Brent Harvey, in which he kept his opponent goalless and largely ineffective.

Since his brilliant debut, he has since played on other key players to great effect including Andrew McLeod, Leigh Montagna and Brett Deledio. He played on Deledio twice in 2009 and restricted the star player to just 16 and 13 disposals respectively, the only two times during the season that Deledio had fewer than 20 touches.

During a match against  in 2013, Picken accidentally collided with goal umpire Courtney Lai in the third quarter, when he was attempting to smother a point-blank shot at goal by Michael Walters; the result was that Lai, a qualified doctor, suffered what was a self-diagnosed an ACL tear. Picken recalled the clash as being "an accident".

Although branded as a tagger, Picken could also win possession of the ball and use it well. When Luke Beveridge took over as coach of the Bulldogs at the end of 2014, he gave Picken a more attacking role. During the Bulldogs' run to the 2016 AFL Premiership, Picken was a crucial figure, starring in all four finals and kicked three goals (including the sealer) in the Grand Final. He was awarded the Best Finals Player by the Western Bulldogs.

In 2017, the Australian food company Australian Almonds approached Picken, along with fellow footballers Scott Selwood, Max Gawn, Brianna Davey and Ellie Blackburn, to serve as an ambassador of their campaign to recognize hard-working but low-profile individuals through the Australian Hard Nut Awards.

While playing in a pre-season game against Hawthorn in Ballarat, Picken received an accidental knock to the head and suffered severe concussion and because of side effects missed the entire 2018 season.

On 1 April 2019, after numerous comeback attempts, Picken announced his retirement due to ongoing concussion symptoms.

Personal life 
Picken is the son of former Collingwood and Sydney footballer: Billy Picken, who's a member of the Collingwood Team of the Century and played across both clubs from 1973 to 1986. Picken's older brother, Marcus Picken, also played for the Brisbane Lions, as did their cousin, former captain and Coleman Medal winner Jonathan Brown.

He is married to Annie Nolan, a blogger and social commentator. They have three children: a son named Malachy (born in 2011) and twin daughters, Delphi and Cheska (born in 2013).

Liam Picken has pledged to donate his brain in hopes to aid further research in chronic traumatic encephopathy as a result of repetitive head injuries sustained during his time in the AFL.

Statistics
Statistics are correct to the end of the 2017 season

|- style="background-color: #EAEAEA"
! scope="row" style="text-align:center" | 2009
|
| 42 || 23 || 8 || 2 || 120 || 190 || 310 || 52 || 98 || 0.3 || 0.1 || 5.2 || 8.3 || 13.5 || 2.3 || 4.3
|-
! scope="row" style="text-align:center" | 2010
|
| 42 || 20 || 8 || 5 || 127 || 158 || 285 || 37 || 104 || 0.4 || 0.3 || 6.4 || 7.9 || 14.3 || 1.9 || 5.2
|- style="background-color: #EAEAEA"
! scope="row" style="text-align:center" | 2011
|
| 42 || 22 || 4 || 4 || 166 || 164 || 330 || 50 || 117 || 0.2 || 0.2 || 7.5 || 7.5 || 15.0 || 2.3 || 5.3
|-
! scope="row" style="text-align:center" | 2012
|
| 42 || 22 || 9 || 6 || 197 || 207 || 404 || 70 || 119 || 0.4 || 0.3 || 9.0 || 9.4 || 18.4 || 3.2 || 5.4
|- style="background-color: #EAEAEA"
! scope="row" style="text-align:center" | 2013
|
| 42 || 20 || 1 || 3 || 181 || 146 || 327 || 67 || 66 || 0.1 || 0.2 || 9.1 || 7.3 || 16.4 || 3.4 || 3.3
|-
! scope="row" style="text-align:center" | 2014
|
| 42 || 22 || 3 || 6 || 217 || 185 || 402 || 85 || 88 || 0.1 || 0.3 || 9.9 || 8.4 || 18.3 || 3.9 || 4.0
|- style="background-color: #EAEAEA"
! scope="row" style="text-align:center" | 2015
|
| 42 || 21 || 13 || 9 || 248 || 249 || 497 || 94 || 135 || 0.6 || 0.4 || 11.8 || 11.9 || 23.7 || 4.5 || 6.4
|-
| scope=row bgcolor=F0E68C | 2016# 
|
| 42 || 26 || 17 || 11 || 300 || 294 || 594 || 121 || 107 || 0.7 || 0.4 || 11.5 || 11.3 || 22.8 || 4.7 || 4.1
|-
! scope="row" style="text-align:center" | 2017
|
| 42 || 22 || 24 || 14 || 197 || 213 || 410 || 84 || 67 || 1.1 || 0.6 || 9.0 || 9.7 || 18.6 || 3.8 || 3.1
|- class="sortbottom"
! colspan=3| Career
! 198
! 87
! 60
! 1753
! 1806
! 3559
! 660
! 901
! 0.4
! 0.3
! 8.9
! 9.1
! 18.0
! 3.3
! 4.6
|}

Honours and achievements
AFL
Team
AFL Premiership: 2016
Pre-season Premiership player: 2010
Individual
Best Finals Player: 2016
Gerry Callahan Medal: 2008

References

External links

Australian rules footballers from Victoria (Australia)
1986 births
Living people
Western Bulldogs players
Western Bulldogs Premiership players
Williamstown Football Club players
Australia international rules football team players
One-time VFL/AFL Premiership players
People from Hamilton, Victoria